Krasimir Smilenov Bezinski (29 June 1961 – 22 April 2019) was a Bulgarian footballer and football coach. 

Bezinski's professional playing career as a defender spanned nearly 20 years, during which he played for five clubs: Pirin Blagoevgrad, CSKA Sofia, Portimonense, Maccabi Ironi Ashdod and Hapoel Petah Tikva. He also made 21 appearances for the Bulgarian national team.

Playing career
Born in Blagoevgrad, Bezinski began his career at local club Pirin, where he played 57 matches between 1978 and 1981. With Pirin he was a losing finalist in the 1980–81 Bulgarian Cup. Then he left to join CSKA Sofia. Bezinski spent eight seasons with CSKA, where he won four Bulgarian League titles, six Bulgarian Cups and three Cups of the Soviet Army. Together with Elin Topuzakov and Momchil Tsvetanov he holds the record for the most times an individual player has won the Bulgarian Cup.

In 1989, Bezinski joined Portuguese side Portimonense, where he played 80 matches for two and a half seasons. After leaving the club in January 1992, he re-joined CSKA Sofia, where he won the title in 1992 and the cup in 1993. 

Then Bezinski spent one season in Israel with Hapoel Petah Tikva and Maccabi Ironi Ashdod. In the 1994–1995 season he appeared for his first club Pirin Blagoevgrad, where ended his playing career.

Managerial career
His coaching career started in 1995. Bezinski worked in the Bulgarian National Team for four years as an assistant coach. He then travelled to Tanzania where he was head coach of Simba S.C. for seven months and was invited to return to the position of an assistant coach of the Bulgarian National Team in January 2009 where he worked until March 2010. 

He was then appointed assistant coach of Al-Qadsiah who played in Professional Saudi Arabian Football League. Before returning to CSKA Sofia as scout he spent 2 month head coach of Al Safa who played in Saudi Arabian D2 League. In May 2014, Al-Safa announced return of Bezinski as head coach of their football team who is now playing in D1 Professional Football League. After spending 2 months and losing his first crown prince game in round 32 playoff against Nahdha team, his contract with AL-Safa was terminated and he returned to Bulgaria.

Career statistics

Club

Honours

Club
CSKA Sofia
Bulgarian League (5): 1981–82, 1982–83, 1986–87, 1988–89, 1991–92
Bulgarian Cup (6): 1982–83, 1984–85, 1986–87, 1987–88, 1988–89, 1992–93
Cup of the Soviet Army (3): 1984-85, 1985-86, 1988-89

References

External links

1961 births
2019 deaths
Bulgarian footballers
Bulgaria international footballers
Bulgarian expatriate footballers
OFC Pirin Blagoevgrad players
PFC CSKA Sofia players
Portimonense S.C. players
Maccabi Ironi Ashdod F.C. players
Hapoel Petah Tikva F.C. players
First Professional Football League (Bulgaria) players
Primeira Liga players
Expatriate footballers in Portugal
Bulgarian expatriate sportspeople in Portugal
Macedonian Bulgarians
Association football defenders
Sportspeople from Blagoevgrad
Deaths from colorectal cancer
Deaths from cancer in Bulgaria